Ian McDougall may refer to:

 Ian McDougall (geologist) (1935–2018), Australian scientist
 Ian McDougall (musician) (born 1938), Canadian composer and trombonist
 Ian McDougall (producer) (1945–2010), Canadian television producer
 Ian McDougall (footballer) (born 1954), Scottish footballer
 Ian McDougall (architect), Australian architect

See also
 Ian MacDougall (1938–2020), Royal Australian Navy officer